Carlos Eduardo Sabja Añez (born January 14, 1990, in Santa Cruz de la Sierra) is a Bolivian football midfielder who is currently a free agent. His last club in the Bolivian league was Real Mamoré.

Club career
Sabja began his football career at a young age attending the well-known Tahuichi Academy. In May 2007, he was loaned to Portuguese club Benfica to train in the youth sector after he awoke the interest of some European scouts while playing with the Bolivian U-17 squad. After one year under evaluation, Sabja didn't make the final cut; therefore, the club decided to let him go. He then returned to Bolivia and signed with first division club Blooming. In short time, he has demonstrated to be a talented prospect with a bright future. In 2009, he had a brief spell with Guabirá, team which gained promotion to first division. In 2010, he was loaned to Real Mamoré.

References
 
 

1990 births
Living people
Sportspeople from Santa Cruz de la Sierra
Bolivian footballers
Association football midfielders
S.L. Benfica footballers
Club Blooming players
Guabirá players
Municipal Real Mamoré players
Bolivian expatriates in Portugal